Bourret can refer to:
 Alex Bourret, hockey player
 Caprice Bourret, model
 Philippe Bourret, badminton player
 René Léon Bourret, French herpetologist and geologist
 Bourret (grape), another name for the French wine grape Terret gris
 Bourret Township, Michigan
 Bourret, Tarn-et-Garonne, France